The Thérèse was a 58-gun ship of the line of the French Navy. She was designed and built by François Pomet in Toulon Dockyard between 1662 and 1665, and was classed as a vaisseau de troisième rang (ship of the third rank). She was part of a French relief effort to Candia during a siege by the Ottomans and was sunk on 24 July 1669 after an explosion in her powder magazine. At the time she was a flagship of the expedition.

History

The Thérèse arrived at Candia on 19 June 1669 in company with 17 transport ships and 6,000 French soldiers. The French force was there to support the Venetian forces during the Siege of Candia. Another 24 French warships arrived on 3 July. Six days after their arrival the leader of the French corps, François de Vendôme, Duc de Beaufort, was killed in battle and  took over. On 10 July a council of all the leaders of the allied armies took place and the decision was made to use the fleet to attack the Turks northwest of the city, as this part of the city was totally impoverished. After the bombardment the allied forces aimed to strike and repel the Turks. 24 July was selected as the day of the operation. As planned that day, the whole Navy sailed west of the city to the mouth of the river Giofyros. The fleet comprised 58 warships mounting 1100 cannon. For three hours the fleet continuously bombarded the Turks, when suddenly La Thérèses powder magazine caught fire, resulting in the destruction of the ship. Only seven of her crew survived out of 350. Immediately after this incident there was great confusion in the French naval force and the fleet's commander, Vincenzo Rospigliosi, ordered the bombardment to be abandoned, and sailed the fleet to the island of Dia.

The accident seriously damaged the citizens' and sailors' morale and caused divisions in the military leadership. The leader of the French force, Philippe de Montaut, decided to withdraw from the city, having sustained casualties of over 2,000 dead and injured, and suffering a shortage of food and supplies.

Captain General Francesco Morosini, tried in vain to change de Montaut's mind. Eventually, between 16 and 21 August, the whole French fleet sailed away leaving the allied forces, a total of 3,600 men, consisting of Venetians, Italians, English, Scottish, Germans and Greeks,  to fight alone against over 60,000 Turks.  A few days later Morosini was informed that Turkish reinforcements had arrived in Crete, and decided to surrender the city. He signed the capitulation on 6 September and the city was handed over to the Turks.

The shipwreck
Manolis Voutsalas, a Greek diver, discovered the wreck of La Thérèse west of the port of Heraklion. However, he was initially unsure of her identity. In 1976, Jacques Cousteau visited Crete and Voutsalas showed him the site of the shipwreck. After several dives, Cousteau identified it as the shipwreck of La Thérèse.
The scientific underwater excavation of the shipwreck started in 1987 by the Greek Ministry of Culture. The archaeologists M. Anagnostopoulou and Nicolas Lianos excavated the shipwreck, succeeded in mapping it and raised several objects. Among them, a bronze cannon with the inscription "Le Duc de Vendôme 1666" (admiral), and "HONARATUS SUCHET F(ecit) TOLONI" (cnf. M. Anagnostopoulou- N. Lianos, ΑΑΑ v.ΧΙΧ(1986). This is considered to be the first systematic underwater excavation in Greece.

See also
 Naval battles of the Cretan Wars

References 

Nomenclature des Vaisseaux du Roi-Soleil de 1661 a 1715. Alain Demerliac (Editions Omega, Nice – various dates).
The Sun King's Vessels (2015) - Jean-Claude Lemineur; English translation by François Fougerat. Editions ANCRE.  
Winfield, Rif and Roberts, Stephen (2017) French Warships in the Age of Sail 1626-1786: Design, Construction, Careers and Fates. Seaforth Publishing. .

Bibliography 
Ο Κρητικος πόλεμος 1645-1669 . Χρυσούλας Τζομπανάκη 
Istoria dela guerra di Candia . Andrea Valiero
Η Υποβρύχια Έρευνα στον κόλπο Δερματά του Ηρακλείου Κρήτης (1988), Μαρία Αναγνοστοπούλου-Νίκος Λιανός, Αρχαιολογικά Ανάλεκτα εξ Αθηνών (ΑΑΑ), τόμος ΧΙΧ (1986), Αρχαιολογικά Χρονικά, 63-70.

1660s ships
Ships of the line of the French Navy
Ships built in France
Shipwrecks of Greece
Maritime incidents in 1669